Øyna is a village in Arendal municipality in Agder county, Norway. The village is located at the far northeastern tip of the island of Tromøy.

References

Villages in Agder
Arendal